The boules competition at the 2017 Games of the Small States of Europe took place on 30 and 31 May 2017 at the Bocciodromo in Borgo Maggiore. It was the first time boules were featured at Games of the Small States of Europe

Medal summary

Medal table

Medalists

References

External links
Results book

Boules sports at the Games of the Small States of Europe
2017 Games of the Small States of Europe